Bromus biebersteinii, the meadow bromegrass or just meadow brome, is a species of flowering plant in the family Poaceae, native to the Caucasus, Iraq, Iran and Afghanistan. It has been developed as a forage in North America and there are a number of cultivars available, including 'Arsenal', 'Cache', 'Fleet', 'MacBeth', 'Montana', 'Paddock' and 'Regar'.

References

biebersteinii
Forages
Flora of the Caucasus
Flora of Iraq
Flora of Iran
Flora of Afghanistan
Plants described in 1817